Giuseppina Occhionero (born 8 August 1978) is an Italian lawyer and politician.

Biography 
Graduated in Law at the University of Bologna, Occhionero began her career as a lawyer in Termoli.

She is elected city councilor in Campomarino and is then appointed assessor for cultural heritage and tourism.

At the 2018 general election, Occhionero is elected to the Chamber of Deputies with the left-wing coalition Free and Equal. She's the only elected deputy of LeU from Molise.

References

External links 
Files about her parliamentary activities (in Italian): XVIII legislature.

1978 births
Living people
21st-century Italian politicians
People from the Province of Campobasso
University of Bologna alumni
Article One (political party) politicians
Italia Viva politicians
21st-century Italian women politicians
Deputies of Legislature XVIII of Italy
Women members of the Chamber of Deputies (Italy)